Bassam al-Sabbagh (born January 1, 1969) is a Syrian diplomat, holding the position of Syria's permanent representative to the United Nations in New York City since November 22, 2020, as well as former Syria's permanent representative to the United Nations Office at Vienna the United Nations Office at Vienna, its former permanent representative to the Organisation for the Prohibition of Chemical Weapons, and its former permanent representative to the International Atomic Energy Agency.

Life and education
He was born in January 1969 in Aleppo.
Graduated from the University of Aleppo as a specialist in international relations, and has a bachelor's degree in political science from the Higher Institute of Political Science in Damascus.

Career
 1994-1995 - Attaché in the Ministry of Foreign Affairs of Syria;
 1995-2000 - Second, then First Secretary of the Syrian Embassy in Washington;
 2000-2001 - Alternate Director in the Office of the Deputy Minister of Foreign Affairs;
 2001-2006 - Counselor at the Permanent Mission of Syria to the UN (New York);
 2006-2010 - Head of Administration at the Syrian Ministry of Foreign Affairs;
 2010-2013 - Permanent Representative of Syria to the UN Office (Vienna).
 2010-2020 - Ambassador to Austria, Slovakia, Slovenia, and Italy.
 2010-2020 - Resident Representative to the IAEA, UNIDO, UNODC (Vienna).
 2013-2020 - Permanent Representative of Syria to the Organisation for the Prohibition of Chemical Weapons (The Hague).
 2020 - present - Head of the Syrian Mission at the UN Headquarters in New York.

References 

Syrian diplomats
Permanent Representatives of Syria to the United Nations
All stub articles
1969 births
Living people
University of Aleppo alumni
People from Aleppo